"10 Days Late" is a song by the American alternative rock band Third Eye Blind. It was released on April 11, 2000, as the third single from the band's second studio album, Blue (1999). The song peaked at number 21 on the Alternative Songs chart. A music video was shot for the single.

Background
"10 Days Late" was written by band members Stephan Jenkins and Arion Salazar. The song is about a friend of Jenkins who had impregnated his girlfriend at a young age; Jenkins was the baby's godfather.

According to Jenkins: "This [song] is more than just a modern rock hit about menstruation. It's sort of acknowledging how life is going to come along, and your status quo will be interrupted. It's gonna happen."

Release
"10 Days Late" was released as the third single from Third Eye Blind's 1999 album, Blue. It was also included on the band's 2006 compilation album, A Collection. "10 Days Late" spent 10 weeks on the US Billboard Modern Rock Tracks chart, peaking at number 21 on June 17, 2000.

Music video
The song's music video was directed by Francis Lawrence and was shot in March 2000. It features the band performing the song in a living room.

Charts

Release history

References

External links
 

1999 songs
2000 singles
Elektra Records singles
Music videos directed by Francis Lawrence
Songs written by Stephan Jenkins
Third Eye Blind songs